The Tiejia Taoist Ecology Temple stands halfway Mount Taibai at approximately 1500 m (6,000 ft), about 70 km west of Xian, in the south west of Shaanxi province, on the border between Mei, Taibai and Zhouzhi counties. Next to the Tiejia Taoist Ecology Temple stands the Ecology Education Center.

History 
On the exact spot where one can today find the Tiejia Taoist Ecology Temple once stood the old Tiejiashu Temple, hidden amongst the foliage of age-old trees. The Tiejiashu Temple was built at the time of the Han Dynasty (206 BC–220) and remained there until the Cultural Revolution. It was one of the oldest temples dedicated to the gods of Mount Taibai and the first temple on the route taken by pilgrims along the south side of the mountain. In the Tiejiashu Temple, the pilgrims were given water and could rest in preparation for the climb to the summit. Every year, between 9 June and 9 July of the Chinese lunar calendar, all temples on Mount Taibai gathered for the big temple feast at the old Tiejiashu Temple. There was a lively market, rituals were performed and many pilgrims started the trail to Ba Xian Tai (Terrace of Immortalisation), the top of Mount Taibai. This summit was the place where Jiang Ziya, the wise minister of the Zhou Dynasty who had helped overthrow the corrupt Shang Dynasty (second millennium BC), had made immortal all those who had come to his aid. Like many temples in China, the Tiejiashu Temple was destroyed during the Cultural Revolution. According to residents from the Mount Taibai area, there was a Taoist monk around the middle of the twentieth century whose name, ironically, was Mao. He was living in the old Tiejiashu Temple when the Cultural Revolution broke out. The residents tried to defend the temples and mountain from attacks by the Red Guard but the old temple was destroyed and the monk was forced to leave. After the Cultural Revolution, in the 1980s, opportunities to restore Taoist temples grew slowly but steadily. First, local residents built a few simple rooms where the three gods of Mount Taibai could reside. Then, in the 1990s, a request to reopen the temple was submitted to the local government body responsible for monitoring religious activity. Permission was granted and, under the leadership of the Louguan Tai Temple, where Lao Zi is said to have written the Tao Te Ching, the rooms regained their use as a place of quiet rest and contemplation. In the autumn of 2002, four extra rooms were built. Now the three gods of Mount Taibai each had their own room, with the remaining rooms available for the monk of the Louguan Tai Temple, who was going to live there, and his guests. Slowly but surely, the old Tiejiashu Temple came back to life, just like many other temples in China. Following many years of ravage and ruin, Taoism seemed just as robust and indomitable as the Sacred Mountains themselves.

The Iron Armour Tree 
Tiejia means ‘Iron Armour’ and shu means ‘tree’, referring to the three-thousand-year-old tree that had always stood by the entrance to the old temple and survived the Cultural Revolution. The edges of its leaves are often serrated, which is why people call it Iron Armour Tree. The tree is known for the curse that is cast on anyone who destroys it. This is why during the Cultural Revolution not even the Red Guard students dared to harm it. The tree is the protector of the Taibai gods and is still worshipped as much as the gods themselves.

Building the Tiejia Taoist Ecology Temple 
It was this spot where the Alliance of Religions and Conservation, at the initiative of the local Taoist community and co-funded by the Ecological Management Foundation, built the Tiejia Taoist Ecology Temple for the worship of the three gods of Mount Taibai and an Ecology Education Center to help stimulating what had been such an important part of Taoism since ancient times, namely preserving the natural environment. In 2004, the World Wildlife Fund appealed to the Alliance of Religions and Conservation for help because they wanted to build an eco-resort on Mount Taibai and had discovered the seven rooms at the site of the old Tiejiashu Temple. Earlier, the World Wildlife Fund had already built a number of panda sanctuaries to protect the environment of the Qinling panda. The eco-resort was now supposed to start generating income as a means of financing those sanctuaries. The World Wildlife Fund asked the Alliance of Religions and Conservation to investigate. The Alliance of Religions and Conservation's secretary-general Martin Palmer met the vice-abbot of the Louguan Tai Temple, Master Ren Xingzhi. Both quickly saw the opportunities for a fruitful and sustainable partnership. These meetings gave rise to the plans for a Tiejia Taoist Ecology Temple with an Ecology Education Center next to it. To help finance the execution of the plans, an appeal was made to Allerd Stikker, founder and chairman of Ecological Management Foundation. Since the inauguration in 2007, the Tiejia Taoist Ecology Temple with the Ecology Education Center have been the epicenter of an effort to make China's Taoist temples more sustainable and to create an awareness of sustainability issues.

The Ecology Education Center 
Respect for nature has always been deeply rooted in Taoist thought and is crucial to China in the present era of ecological crisis. Through the Ecology Education Center, the Taoist monks of the Tiejia Taoist Ecology Temple would be able to organize meetings and training programs designed to help people think in terms of sustainability, not only local visitors but also monks from other temples. The Alliance of Religions and Conservation's ambition was to inspire all temples and help them set up their own ecology education centers, thereby facilitating a network of such centers throughout the Sacred Mountains.

Design 
The Tiejia Taoist Ecology Temple is designed by Chinese architect He Xiaoxin. It is modest in size and constructed with sustainable, natural materials from the region. In the background you can hear the constant babble of the stream that flows along the front of the temple. This is because Taoist temples are generally modest and simple in size and structure and one with nature. It often seems as if they grew from the earth and stones that surround them. They are certainly not built for you to stand by the window and admire the view. Like other Chinese temples, the Tiejia Taoist Ecology Temple faces south, the direction of the divine, or heaven. The three gods of Mount Taibai also face south, making everyone else face north, towards the earth.

To fully understand the construction of the Tiejia Taoist Ecology Temple also the Chinese philosophy of feng shui should be borne in mind. It is mostly because of this feng shui philosophy that the Tiejia Taoist Ecology Temple is built as an integral element of its surroundings and the natural environment. Going by the rules of feng shui, the temple stands in an ideal spot: against the background of a Sacred Mountain with a stream flowing along the front and tall, old trees all around.

Nature and tradition 
The design of the temple follows the traditional style of temples from the Qing Dynasty. This style requires the square surrounding the temple and the temple itself to be symmetric, with the temple standing at the center-back of the square, flanked by other religious buildings. In the case of the Tiejia Taoist Ecology Temple, the Ecology Education Center is located west of the temple and one of the old temporary rooms east. During construction the Ecology Education Center was positioned a few yards too far to the east, making the design of the square no longer perfectly symmetric and the square a bit smaller than planned. But the walls of the temple site follow tradition to the letter, with a natural hedge of shrubs instead of a stone structure. The temple walls themselves are clad in tiles. The roof of the temple features all kinds of symbols of immortality and hope such as butterflies, fishes and bats, and a dog that barks when evil spirits come near. The ends of the stone pipes punctuating the roof consist of angry looking faces that keep away evil spirits. On the underside of the temple roof, the wood is red as is one of the outside walls of the education center. Red stands for good luck, the sun and energy, and Taoists consider this the most ‘powerful’ colour of all. When you enter the temple, the three gods of Mount Taibai -now known as Da (Great) Taibai, Er (Second) Taibai and San (Third) Taibai - stand in the middle of a spartan space. On both sides of the gods, the walls are covered with murals. In its center, by the feet of the three gods of Mount Taibai, stands the temple's incense burner.

Incense Burner 
In every Taoist temple stands an incense burner. The tradition of burning incense originated during the Zhou Dynasty (1000–256 BC) when king Zhou Men Wong used the rising smoke to send his prayers to heaven. The incense burner of the Tiejia Taoist Ecology Temple was donated by Allerd Stikker, founder and chairman of the Ecological Management Foundation, in memory of his daughter Anneke Dorina Stikker (1955–2004). He Xiaoxin, the Chinese architect of the Tiejia Taoist Ecology Temple and the Ecology Education Center, designed the incense burner together with Allerd Stikker and his family. The incense burner is plated in robust but refined red bronze with elegant horses galloping along the top edge that, in Taoist tradition, carry the soul of the departed to eternity.

Religious buildings and structures in Shaanxi
Taoist temples in China